St. Philip Neri's Church may refer to:

Italy 
 San Filippo Neri, Camerino
 San Filippo Neri, Castelfranco Piandiscò
 San Filippo Neri, Cingoli
 San Filippo Neri, Cortona
 San Filippo Neri, Genoa
 San Filippo Neri, Lodi
 San Filippo Neri, Macerata
 San Filippo Neri, Ragusa
 San Filippo Neri, Recanati
 San Filippo Neri in via Giulia, Rome
 San Filippo Neri, Spoleto
 San Filippo Neri, Treia
 San Filippo Neri, Turin

United States 
 St. Philip Neri Parish Historic District, Indianapolis, Indiana
 St. Philip Neri's Church (Bronx), New York

See also 
 St. Philip Neri Church shelling, Sri Lanka
 St. Philip's Church (disambiguation)